Stygian Vistas is an EP by Soma, released on July 1, 1997 through Extreme Records.

Track listing

Personnel 
Soma
Pieter Bourke – instruments
David Thrussell – instruments
Production and additional personnel
Boris Polonski – instruments on "Alchemical Nuptial"
Soma – mastering, cover art
François Tétaz – mastering
Jacek Tuschewski – cover art

References

External links 
 

1997 EPs
Extreme Records EPs
Soma (band) albums